Park Han Hee is a South Korean lawyer, human right activist and transgender woman. She is the first openly transgender lawyer in Korea.

References

1985 births
Living people
Seoul National University alumni
Pohang University of Science and Technology alumni
South Korean transgender people
21st-century South Korean lawyers
Transgender women
LGBT lawyers